Romain Gerard Michel Thievin (born 13 March 1979) is a five-time French champion in car racing and also a co-presenter of FAST CLUB, a car TV show broadcasting on W9 channel in France and Belgium. Romain is also an accomplished stunt driver, having worked on more than 150 movies. In 2003, he won a Taurus World Stunt Award  for his work in The Bourne Identity.

Thievin was born in Fontainebleau, France. With over 10 years of racing instruction, he has been a racing instructor for various racing schools in Europe between 2000 and 2004. He is the founder and owner of Cascadevents (largest racing school in France) since 2004. Thievin is also the founder and owner of Exotics Racing (racing school based at Las Vegas Motor Speedway ) since 2009. As a regular driver handling "ride-alongs" for Cascadevents and Exotics Racing, Romain has had more than 40,000 laps of high-speed drifting rides in the Corvette Z06, Porsche GT3-RS and Ferrari 430 Scuderia without any accidents.

Racing Accomplishments 
 1996: Formula Renault French Championship – 7th place overall
 1997: Citroen Saxo Cup – 10th best rookie of the year
 1998: Renault Megane Trophy – 5th best rookie of the year
 1999: Peugeot 106 Trophy – 2nd overall, Win at the 12 Hours of Le Mans
 2000: Peugeot 306 Cup – Won Championship
 2001:
 Superproduction French Championship with a Peugeot 306 Maxi: won championship, 13 wins over 14 races
 Peugeot 206 CC Cup: won championship and best rookie
 2002:
 Official Driver for Peugeot in the French National Championship of Touring Cars (Supertourisme), in a Peugeot 406 Silhouette: 10th overall in the “A” Championship with a “B”       : Championship car
 GT French Championship: 2 races in a Venturi LM400
 2009: 5 races in the Racecar Euro Series as TV host for French car TV show FAST CLUB – 2 wins, 3 podiums
 2011: Racecar Euro Series: Driver with the Fast Club team in the #99 Ford Mustang 
 Finished in 2nd place 
 2011: World Touring Racecar at Daytona International Speedway 
 2nd place in the Sprint GT 1 Race at Daytona International Speedway
 3rd place in the Endurance Louis Chevrolet Race at Daytona International Speedway
 2012: NASCAR Euro Series: Driver with the Exotics Racing team in the #99 Dodge Challenger. 1st runner-up of the Elite Division and Victory in Team classification with David Perisset.
 2013: NASCAR Super Late Model division at The Bullring at Las Vegas Motor Speedway, 3rd overall, 1 win, Best rookie, 1st frenchman to win a nascar race in USA.

Movies and television 
 Stunt driver in more than 150 movies & TV series including feature films as Ronin, Taxi and The Bourne Identity
 Official race car driver and co-host for the French car TV show Fast Club
 Winner of the Taurus World Stunt Award in 2003 (Hollywood) for doubling Matt Damon in “The Bourne Identity”

References 

1979 births
Living people
Sportspeople from Fontainebleau
French motorsport people
French racing drivers
French television presenters